Anthony James Featherstone (July 31, 1949 – October 30, 2021) was a Canadian professional ice hockey forward who played 130 games in the National Hockey League for the California Golden Seals and Minnesota North Stars. He also played 108 games in the World Hockey Association with the Toronto Toros.

Featherstone died on October 30, 2021, at the age of 72.

Career statistics

Regular season and playoffs

References

External links
 

1949 births
2021 deaths
California Golden Seals players
Canadian ice hockey forwards
Ice hockey people from Toronto
Minnesota North Stars players
National Hockey League first-round draft picks
Nova Scotia Voyageurs players
Oakland Seals draft picks
Oakland Seals players
Peterborough Petes (ice hockey) players
Providence Reds players
Toronto Toros players